National Education Foundation (reporting name: NEF) is an autonomous body responsible for the provision of basic education and literacy to the children. It was established in 1994 by the Government of Pakistan.

References 

Government of Pakistan
1994 establishments in Pakistan